Suwonbuk Middle School (Korean: 수원북중학교, Hanja: 水原北中學校) is a middle school located in Suwon, South Korea. As of 2010, the school had 1,023 students enrolled. The school was established on 8 June 1936 and opened on 1 September 1951.

Notable alumni
Oh Hyun-kyu, conductor

As a filming location
The school was used in the 2003 film The Classic, and 2007 TV series The Devil.

References

External links
 Suwonbuk Middle School

Middle schools in South Korea
Schools in Suwon